Winton Airport  is an airport serving Winton, Queensland, Australia.

Facilities

Airlines and destinations

See also
 List of airports in Queensland

References

External links
 Winton Airport image from National Library of Australia, 2005

Airports in Queensland
Central West Queensland